Silsila (also transliterated as Silsilah, Silsileh, Silsilay, Selseleh, Selsele, etc.) is an Arabic term meaning "chain", "lineage".

Silsila may also refer to:
 Silsila (1981 film), a Bollywood film starring Amitabh Bachchan, Rekha and Jaya Bhaduri, with music by Shiv Hair and lyrics by Javed Akhtar.
 Silsila (1987 film), a Pakistani Punjabi-language film
 Silsilay, a Pakistani TV series
 Silsiilay, a 2005 Hindi film
 Selseleh County, Iran
 Gebel el-Silsila, an archaeological quarry site in Egypt